The 2017–18 Coupe de France preliminary rounds Hauts-de-France make up the qualifying competition to decide which teams from the French Hauts-de-France region take part in the main competition from the seventh round.

First round 
The matches in Hauts-de-France were played on 26 and 27 August 2017.

First round results: Hauts-de-France

Second round 
These matches were played on 3 September 2017.

Second round results: Hauts-de-France

Third round 
These matches were played on 10 and 17 September 2017.

Third round results: Hauts-de-France

Fourth round 
These matches were played on 22, 23 and 24 September 2017.

Fourth round results: Hauts-de-France

Fifth round 
These matches were played on 7 and 8 October 2017.

Fifth round results: Hauts-de-France

Sixth round 
These matches were played on 21 and 22 October and 5 November 2017. Sixth round results: Hauts-de-France

References 

2017–18 Coupe de France